A global, multilingual list of rhythm and blues and contemporary R&B musicians recognized via popular R&B genres as songwriters, instrumentalists, vocalists, mixing engineers, and for musical composition and record production.

Listed bands, groups & individuals "professionally known as", through Pseudonyms are sorted via their 1st stage name letter and ensembles definitively articled "The", rest in T. Performers adhering to legal name and pet-names such as "Donnie<-Donald Klang", "Billy<-William Preston" are surname alphabetized.

List of R&B musicians encompasses sub-genres such as urban-contemporary, doo wop, southern, neo-soul and soul, indie, alternative, country, rap, ska, funk, pop, rock, electronic and new jack swing fusions. Criteria for list inclusion is citation or article basis infobox mention of: Rhythm & Blues or listed sub-genres, engineers and producers require album credits residing in any relevant artists articles.

Numbers

A

B

C

D

E

F

G

H

I

J

K

L

M

N

O

P

Q

R

S

T

U

V

W

X

Y

Z

See also

 American R&B musical groups
 List of new jack swing artists
 List of music genres and styles

Billboard & UK R&B Chart Histories 
 Hot R&B/Hip-Hop Billboard Songs | Adult R&B Billboard Songs
 Top R&B/Hip-Hop Billboard Albums | R&B/Hip-Hop Billboard Airplay
 List of UK R&B Albums Chart number ones of 2021

 
RandB